Anthony Petro Mayalla (April 23, 1940 – August 19, 2009) was Tanzanian Archbishop of the Roman Catholic Archdiocese of Mwanza from his installation on February 28, 1988 until his death in 2009. Mayalla was also the founder of the Saint Augustine University of Tanzania (SAUT) and the Weil Bugando Medical Centre (WBMC).

Early life 
Anthony Petro Mayalla was born in the Nyamhungu village (Nera), Ng'wabagole Parish of Kwimba District, Tanganyika (present-day Tanzania) on April 23, 1940. He attended primary and secondary school in Kwimba District.

Mayalla was ordained a Catholic priest on December 20, 1970, at Ibindo Parish in the Mwanza Diocese.

Mayalla studied at Loyola University Chicago from 1973 until 1975, receiving a degree in education.

Career 
Returning to Tanzania, he was elevated to the bishopric of the Roman Catholic Diocese of Musoma on February 22, 1979.

Mayalla served as the head of the President of the TEC Council (Tanzania Episcopal Conference) beginning in June 1983 while he was Bishop of Mwanza.

Miyalla was formally installed as Archbishop of the Roman Catholic Archdiocese of Mwanza on February 28, 1988. He remained in post until his death in 2009.

Mayalla was also the founder of the Saint Augustine University of Tanzania (SAUT), and the Weil Bugando Medical Centre (WBMC) in Mwanza.

Death 
Mayalla fell ill in the morning of August 19, 2009. He died of a heart attack at the Weil Bugando Medical Centre later on the same day. He was 69 years old.

References

External links
Catholic Hierarchy: Archbishop Anthony Mayalla

1940 births
2009 deaths
Loyola University Chicago alumni
Tanzanian Roman Catholic archbishops
20th-century Roman Catholic bishops in Tanzania
Roman Catholic bishops of Musoma
Roman Catholic archbishops of Mwanza